The Defamation of Strickland Banks Tour was a concert tour by British musician Plan B in support of his second studio album The Defamation of Strickland Banks. Lasting from January 2010–September 2011, the tour visited the United Kingdom, Europe, the United States and Oceania.

Background
The Defamation of Strickland Banks Tour was Plan B's first solo concert tour since the Who Needs Actions When You Got Words Tour in 2007. Following touring for his debut album, Plan B spent most of his time writing and recording for his second studio album and began a film career with roles in Adulthood (2008) and Harry Brown (2009). Plan B also toured as guest vocalist during Chase & Status' Debut Live Tour in 2009 performing "Pieces" and "End Credits" with the group.

Plan B commenced the tour with a warm up show at Café de Paris, London on 20 January 2010 and then embarked on a tour of the United Kingdom in April 2010 and played European festival dates during summer 2010. After the success of The Defamation of Strickland Banks album, which went on to become the UK's fifth best-selling album of the year, the tour was later expanded later into 2010 and 2011 with further legs in the United Kingdom, Europe, the United States, and Oceania.

Officially-released live performances recorded during the tour include "She Said" and "Welcome to Hell" (live from Cafe de Paris) released as bonus tracks on the deluxe edition of The Defamation of Strickland Banks and the iTunes Festival: London 2010 download EP released in July 2010.

Live band
 Plan B – vocals
 Tom Wright-Goss – guitar
 Adam Jordan – guitar
 Jodi Milliner – bass
 Richard Cassell – drums
 Christiana Kayode – backing vocals
 LaDonna Harley-Peters – backing vocals
 Faith SFX – beatbox
 Sam Agard  – drums (Legs 4–5)

Support acts
 Faith SFX (2010–2011)
 Maverick Sabre (April 2010)
 WhenWeAreKings (April 2010)
 Tinie Tempah (26 July 2010)
 Clare Maguire (October 2010)
 Liam Bailey (March 2011)
 Eliza Doolittle (April 2011)
 Wretch 32 (31 May–1 June 2011)
 Katy B (25 August 2011)

Set list
{{hidden
| headercss = background: #ccccff; font-size: 100%; width: 65%;
| contentcss = text-align: left; font-size: 100%; width: 75%;
| header = Wolverhampton Civic Hall Setlist, 3 March 2011
| content =
  "Writing's on the Wall"
  "Free"
  "Welcome to Hell"
  "Love Goes Down"
  "Traded in My Cigarettes"
  "Prayin'
  "Darkest Place"
  "Coming Up Easy"
  "Hard Times" / "Runaway" / "Charmaine"
  "What You Gonna Do"
  "She Said"

Encore
  Soul Medley: "The Tracks of My Tears" / "Lean on Me" / "My Girl" / "Stand by Me"
  Dubstep Medley: "Stand By Me" / "Baden Baden" / "Ain't No Sunshine" / "Kiss from a Rose" / "Forgot About B"
  "No More Eatin'"
  "Pieces"
  "Stay Too Long"
}}

Tour dates

Notes
Festivals and other miscellaneous performances

 Supporting Noel Gallagher
 As part of Camden Crawl
 As part of Radio 1's Big Weekend
 As part of RockNess
 As part of Glastonbury Festival
 As part of Wakestock
 As part of Oxegen
 As part of T4 on the Beach
 As part of NASS Festival
 As part of iTunes Festival
 Charity concert for War Child
 As part of Paredes de Coura Festival
 As part of Boardmasters Festival
 As part of The Big Chill
 As part of The Edge Festival
 As part of V Festival
 As part of Rock en Seine
 Charity concert for Help for Heroes
 Charity concert for Party for Pakistan
 Supporting Elton John
 As part of Big Day Out
 As part of Coachella Festival
 Supporting Bruno Mars and Janelle Monáe
 Supporting Adele
 As part of Evolution Festival
 As part of Majorca Rocks & Ibiza Rocks
 As part of Caribana Festival
 As part of Isle of Wight Festival
 As part of Orange Warsaw Festival
 As part of Wireless Festival
 As part of T in the Park
 As part of Benicàssim Festival
 As part of Stirbey Festival
 As part of Belsonic
 As part of Jersey Live

Cancellations and rescheduled shows

References

External links
 

2010 concert tours
2011 concert tours
Plan B (musician) concert tours